Surfactants are chemical compounds that decrease the surface tension or interfacial tension between two liquids, a liquid and a gas, or a liquid and a solid. Surfactants may function as emulsifiers, wetting agents, detergents, foaming agents, or dispersants.
The word "surfactant" is a blend of surface-active agent,
coined .

Agents that increase surface tension are "surface active" in the literal sense but are not called surfactants as their effect is opposite to the common meaning. A common example of surface tension increase is salting out: by adding an inorganic salt to an aqueous solution of a weakly polar substance, the substance will precipitate. The substance may itself be a surfactant – this is one  of the reasons why many surfactants are ineffective in sea water.

Composition and structure

Surfactants are usually organic compounds that are akin to amphiphilic, which means that this molecule, being as double-agent, each contains a hydrophilic "water-seeking" group (the head), and a hydrophobic "water-avoiding" group (the tail).  As a result, a surfactant contains both a water-soluble component and a water-insoluble component. Surfactants diffuse in water and get adsorbed at interfaces between air and water, or at the interface between oil and water in the case where water is mixed with oil. The water-insoluble hydrophobic group may extend out of the bulk water phase into a non-water phase such as air or oil phase, while the water-soluble head group remains bound in the water phase. 

The hydrophobic tail may be either lipophilic ("oil-seeking") or lipophobic ("oil-avoiding") depending on its chemistry. Hydrocarbon groups are usually lipophilic, for use in soaps and detergents, while fluorocarbon groups are lipophobic, for use in repelling stains or reducing surface tension.

World production of surfactants is estimated at 15 million tons per year, of which about half are soaps.  Other surfactants produced on a particularly large scale are linear alkylbenzene sulfonates (1.7 million tons/y), lignin sulfonates (600,000 tons/y), fatty alcohol ethoxylates (700,000 tons/y), and alkylphenol ethoxylates (500,000 tons/y).

Structure of surfactant phases in water

In the bulk aqueous phase, surfactants form aggregates, such as micelles, where the hydrophobic tails form the core of the aggregate and the hydrophilic heads are in contact with the surrounding liquid. Other types of aggregates can also be formed, such as spherical or cylindrical micelles or lipid bilayers. The shape of the aggregates depends on the chemical structure of the surfactants, namely the balance in size between the hydrophilic head and hydrophobic tail. A measure of this is the hydrophilic-lipophilic balance (HLB). Surfactants reduce the surface tension of water by adsorbing at the liquid-air interface. The relation that links the surface tension and the surface excess is known as the Gibbs isotherm.

Dynamics of surfactants at interfaces
The dynamics of surfactant adsorption is of great importance for practical applications such as in foaming, emulsifying or coating processes, where bubbles or drops are rapidly generated and need to be stabilized. The dynamics of absorption depend on the diffusion coefficient of the surfactant. As the interface is created, the adsorption is limited by the diffusion of the surfactant to the interface. In some cases, there can exist an energetic barrier to adsorption or desorption of the surfactant. If such a barrier limits the adsorption rate, the dynamics are said to be ‘kinetically limited'. Such energy barriers can be due to steric or electrostatic repulsions.
The surface rheology of surfactant layers, including the elasticity and viscosity of the layer, play an important role in the stability of foams and emulsions.

Characterization of interfaces and surfactant layers
Interfacial and surface tension can be characterized by classical methods such as the
-pendant or spinning drop method.
Dynamic surface tensions, i.e. surface tension as a function of time, can be obtained by the maximum bubble pressure apparatus

The structure of surfactant layers can be studied by ellipsometry or X-ray reflectivity.

Surface rheology can be characterized by the oscillating drop method or shear surface rheometers such as double-cone, double-ring or magnetic rod shear surface rheometer.

In biology

The human body produces diverse surfactants. Pulmonary surfactant is produced in the lungs in order to facilitate breathing by increasing total lung capacity, and lung compliance. In respiratory distress syndrome or RDS, surfactant replacement therapy helps patients have normal respiration by using pharmaceutical forms of the surfactants. One example of a pharmaceutical pulmonary surfactant is Survanta (beractant) or its generic form Beraksurf, produced by Abbvie and Tekzima respectively. Bile salts, a surfactant produced in the liver, play an important role in digestion.

Safety and environmental risks 
Most anionic and non-ionic surfactants are non-toxic, having LD50 comparable to table salt. The toxicity of quaternary ammonium compounds, which are antibacterial and antifungal, varies. Dialkyldimethylammonium chlorides (DDAC, DSDMAC) used as fabric softeners have low LD50 (5 g/kg) and are essentially non-toxic, while the disinfectant alkylbenzyldimethylammonium chloride has an LD50 of 0.35 g/kg. Prolonged exposure to surfactants can irritate and damage the skin because surfactants disrupt the lipid membrane that protects skin and other cells. Skin irritancy generally increases in the series non-ionic, amphoteric, anionic, cationic surfactants.

Surfactants are routinely deposited in numerous ways on land and into water systems, whether as part of an intended process or as industrial and household waste.

Anionic surfactants can be found in soils as the result of sewage sludge application, wastewater irrigation, and remediation processes. Relatively high concentrations of surfactants together with multimetals can represent an environmental risk. At low concentrations, surfactant application is unlikely to have a significant effect on trace metal mobility.

In the case of the Deepwater Horizon oil spill, unprecedented amounts of Corexit were sprayed directly into the ocean at the leak and on the sea-water's surface.  The apparent theory was that the surfactants isolate droplets of oil, making it easier for petroleum-consuming microbes to digest the oil.  The active ingredient in Corexit is dioctyl sodium sulfosuccinate (DOSS), sorbitan monooleate (Span 80), and polyoxyethylenated sorbitan monooleate (Tween-80).

Biodegradation
Because of the volume of surfactants released into the environment, their biodegradation is of great interest. Strategies to enhance degradation include ozone treatment and biodegradation. Two major surfactants, linear alkylbenzene sulfonates (LAS) and the alkyl phenol ethoxylates (APE) break down under aerobic conditions found in sewage treatment plants and in soil to nonylphenol, which is thought to be an endocrine disruptor.  Interest in biodegradable surfactants has led to much interest in "biosurfactants" such as those derived from amino acids.

Attracting much attention is the non-biodegradability of fluorosurfactant, e.g. perfluorooctanoic acid (PFOA).

Applications
The annual global production of surfactants was 13 million tons in 2008. In 2014, the world market for surfactants reached a volume of more than US $33 billion. Market researchers expect annual revenues to increase by 2.5% per year to around $40.4 billion until 2022. The commercially most significant type of surfactants is currently the anionic surfactant LAS, which is widely used in cleaners and detergents. 

Surfactants play an important role as cleaning, wetting, dispersing, emulsifying, foaming and anti-foaming agents in many practical applications and products, including detergents, fabric softeners, motor oils, emulsions, soaps, paints, adhesives, inks, anti-fogs, ski waxes, snowboard wax, deinking of recycled papers, in flotation, washing and enzymatic processes, and laxatives. Also agrochemical formulations such as herbicides (some), insecticides, biocides (sanitizers), and spermicides (nonoxynol-9). Personal care products such as cosmetics, shampoos, shower gel, hair conditioners, and toothpastes. Surfactants are used in firefighting and pipelines (liquid drag reducing agents). Alkali surfactant polymers are used to mobilize oil in oil wells.

Surfactants act to cause the displacement of air from the matrix of cotton pads and bandages so that medicinal solutions can be absorbed for application to various body areas. They also act to displace dirt and debris by the use of detergents in the washing of wounds and via the application of medicinal lotions and sprays to surface of skin and mucous membranes.

Detergents in biochemistry and biotechnology
In solution, detergents help solubilize a variety of chemical species by dissociating aggregates and unfolding proteins.  Popular surfactants in the biochemistry laboratory are sodium lauryl sulfate (SDS) and cetyl trimethylammonium bromide (CTAB). Detergents are key reagents to extract protein by lysis of the cells and tissues: They disorganize the membrane's lipid bilayer (SDS, Triton X-100, X-114, CHAPS, DOC, and NP-40), and solubilize proteins. Milder detergents such as octyl thioglucoside, octyl glucoside or dodecyl maltoside are used to solubilize membrane proteins such as enzymes and receptors without denaturing them. Non-solubilized material is harvested by centrifugation or other means. For electrophoresis, for example, proteins are classically treated with SDS to denature the native tertiary and quaternary structures, allowing the separation of proteins according to their molecular weight.

Detergents have also been used to decellularise organs. This process maintains a matrix of proteins that preserves the structure of the organ and often the microvascular network. The process has been successfully used to prepare organs such as the liver and heart for transplant in rats. Pulmonary surfactants are also naturally secreted by type II cells of the lung alveoli in mammals.

Quantum dot preparation
Surfactants are used with quantum dots in order to manipulate their growth, assembly, and electrical properties, in addition to mediating reactions on their surfaces. Research is ongoing in how surfactants arrange themselves on the surface of the quantum dots.

Surfactants in droplet-based microfluidics 
Surfactants play an important role in droplet-based microfluidics in the stabilization of the droplets, and the prevention of the fusion of droplets during incubation.

Heterogeneous catalysis 
Janus-type material is used as a surfactant-like heterogeneous catalyst for the synthesis of adipic acid.

Classification
The "tails" of most surfactants are fairly similar, consisting of a hydrocarbon chain, which can be branched, linear, or aromatic. Fluorosurfactants have fluorocarbon chains. Siloxane surfactants have siloxane chains.

Many important surfactants include a polyether chain terminating in a highly polar anionic group. The polyether groups often comprise ethoxylated (polyethylene oxide-like) sequences inserted to increase the hydrophilic character of a surfactant. Polypropylene oxides conversely, may be inserted to increase the lipophilic character of a surfactant.

Surfactant molecules have either one tail or two; those with two tails are said to be double-chained.

Most commonly, surfactants are classified according to polar head group. A non-ionic surfactant has no charged groups in its head. The head of an ionic surfactant carries a net positive, or negative, charge. If the charge is negative, the surfactant is more specifically called anionic; if the charge is positive, it is called cationic. If a surfactant contains a head with two oppositely charged groups, it is termed zwitterionic, or amphoteric.  Commonly encountered surfactants of each type include:

Anionic: sulfate, sulfonate, and phosphate, carboxylate derivatives
Anionic surfactants contain anionic functional groups at their head, such as sulfate, sulfonate, phosphate, and carboxylates.
Prominent alkyl sulfates include ammonium lauryl sulfate, sodium lauryl sulfate (sodium dodecyl sulfate, SLS, or SDS), and the related alkyl-ether sulfates sodium laureth sulfate (sodium lauryl ether sulfate or SLES), and sodium myreth sulfate.

Others include:
Docusate (dioctyl sodium sulfosuccinate) 
Perfluorooctanesulfonate (PFOS)
Perfluorobutanesulfonate
 Alkyl-aryl ether phosphates
 Alkyl ether phosphates

Carboxylates are the most common surfactants and comprise the carboxylate salts (soaps), such as sodium stearate.  More specialized species include sodium lauroyl sarcosinate and carboxylate-based fluorosurfactants such as perfluorononanoate, perfluorooctanoate (PFOA or PFO).

Cationic head groups
pH-dependent primary, secondary, or tertiary amines; primary and secondary amines become positively charged at pH < 10: octenidine dihydrochloride.

Permanently charged quaternary ammonium salts: cetrimonium bromide (CTAB), cetylpyridinium chloride (CPC), benzalkonium chloride (BAC), benzethonium chloride (BZT), dimethyldioctadecylammonium chloride, and dioctadecyldimethylammonium bromide (DODAB).

Zwitterionic surfactants
Zwitterionic (amphoteric) surfactants have both cationic and anionic centers attached to the same molecule.  The cationic part is based on primary, secondary, or tertiary amines or quaternary ammonium cations.  The anionic part can be more variable and include sulfonates, as in the sultaines CHAPS (3-[(3-cholamidopropyl)dimethylammonio]-1-propanesulfonate) and cocamidopropyl hydroxysultaine. Betaines such as cocamidopropyl betaine have a carboxylate with the ammonium. The most common biological zwitterionic surfactants have a phosphate anion with an amine or ammonium, such as the phospholipids phosphatidylserine, phosphatidylethanolamine, phosphatidylcholine, and sphingomyelins.

Lauryldimethylamine oxide and myristamine oxide are two commonly used zwitterionic surfactants of the tertiary amine oxides structural type.

Non-ionic 

Non-ionic surfactants have covalently bonded oxygen-containing hydrophilic groups, which are bonded to hydrophobic parent structures. The water-solubility of the oxygen groups is the result of hydrogen bonding. Hydrogen bonding decreases with increasing temperature, and the water solubility of non-ionic surfactants therefore decreases with increasing temperature.

Non-ionic surfactants are less sensitive to water hardness than anionic surfactants, and they foam less strongly. The differences between the individual types of non-ionic surfactants are slight, and the choice is primarily governed having regard to the costs of special properties (e.g., effectiveness and efficiency, toxicity, dermatological compatibility, biodegradability) or permission for use in food.

Ethoxylates

Fatty alcohol ethoxylates 

 Narrow-range ethoxylate
 Octaethylene glycol monododecyl ether
 Pentaethylene glycol monododecyl ether

Alkylphenol ethoxylates (APEs or APEOs) 

 Nonoxynols
 Triton X-100

Fatty acid ethoxylates 
Fatty acid ethoxylates are a class of very versatile surfactants, which combine in a single molecule the characteristic of a weakly anionic, pH-responsive head group with the presence of stabilizing and temperature responsive ethyleneoxide units.

Special ethoxylated fatty esters and oils

Ethoxylated amines and/or fatty acid amides 

 Polyethoxylated tallow amine
 Cocamide monoethanolamine
 Cocamide diethanolamine

Terminally blocked ethoxylates 

 Poloxamers

Fatty acid esters of polyhydroxy compounds

Fatty acid esters of glycerol 

 Glycerol monostearate
 Glycerol monolaurate

Fatty acid esters of sorbitol 

Spans:

 Sorbitan monolaurate 
 Sorbitan monostearate 
 Sorbitan tristearate

Tweens:

 Tween 20
 Tween 40
 Tween 60
 Tween 80

Fatty acid esters of sucrose

Alkyl polyglucosides 

 Decyl glucoside
 Lauryl glucoside
 Octyl glucoside

See also

 
 
 
 
 
 , an assay that indicates anionic surfactants in water with a bluing reaction.
 
 
 
Surfactant leaching

References

External links
 

 
Bioremediation
Biotechnology
Cleaning product components
Colloidal chemistry
Environmental terminology
Underwater diving physics